Prachi Road Junction railway station is a railway station in the Bhavnagar railway division of the Western Railway. It is a junction railway station on Veraval–Prachi–Kodinar line and Veraval–Prachi–Delvada line. It is located at Panikotha village, Talala taluka, Gir Somnath district, Gujarat, India. It serves Prachi village, located 12 km away, in Sutrapada taluka and surrounding villages. Only passenger trains halt here.

References

See also
 Western Railway

Railway stations in Gir Somnath district
Bhavnagar railway division
Railway junction stations in Gujarat